Both Feet on the Ground is an album by guitarist Kenny Burrell recorded in 1973 and released on the Fantasy Records label.

Reception

Allmusic awarded the album 4½ stars.

Track listing 
All compositions by Kenny Burrell except as indicated
 "Naña" (Moacir Santos, Mario Telles, Yanna Kotti) - 6:18   
 "All Mine (Minha)" (Francis Hime, Ray Evans, Jay Livingston) - 6:24   
 "Tomorrow" (Benny Golson) - 6:33   
 "Spin" (Mike Wofford) - 4:48   
 "Good Morning Heartache" (Ervin Drake, Dan Fisher, Irene Higginbotham) - 4:57   
 "Listen to the Dawn" - 4:25   
 "Both Feet on the Ground" - 6:29

Personnel 
Kenny Burrell - guitar, arranger (track 5)
Al Aarons (tracks 1-4 & 7), Oscar Brashear (track 6) - trumpet, flügelhorn
Maurice Spears - trombone (tracks 1-4, 6 & 7) 
Jerome Richardson (tracks 1-4 & 7), Ernie Watts (track 6) - clarinet, flute, piccolo, alto saxophone, tenor saxophone
Jack Nimitz - clarinet, flute, bass flute, baritone saxophone (tracks 1-4, 6 & 7) 
Mike Wofford - piano, electric piano, arranger (track 4)
Reggie Johnson - bass
Lenny McBrowne - drums
Moacir Santos - congas, percussion
Benny Golson - arranger (tracks 1-3, 6 & 7)

References 

Kenny Burrell albums
1973 albums
Fantasy Records albums
Albums arranged by Benny Golson